Women's missionary societies include a diverse set of scopes, including medical, educational, and religious. Societies provide services in-country and in foreign lands.

History

Canada
 Canada Congregational Woman's Board of Missions - 1886
 United Baptist Woman's Missionary Union of the Maritime Provinces - 1906
 Woman's Baptist Foreign Missionary Society of Ontario (West) - 1876
 Woman's Baptist Foreign Missionary Society of Eastern Ontario and Quebec - 1876
 Woman's Missionary Society of the Methodist Church, Canada - after 1834
 Woman's Missionary Society of the Presbyterian Church in Canada
 Woman's Missionary Society of the Presbyterian Church in Canada (Eastern Section) - 1876
 Woman's Missionary Society of the Presbyterian Church in Canada (Western Division) - 1877

India

 Delhi Female Medical Mission - 1866

United Kingdom
 Church of England Zenana Missionary Society - 1880
 Society for Promotion of Female Education in the East - 1853
 Wesleyan Ladies' Auxiliary for Female Education in Foreign Countries - 1832

United States
A missionary society formed in 1799 to assist in increasing an interest in its work in foreign countries, and in raising missionary efforts for the same, a woman's missionary society was organized in 1801. With the same object, "Cent Societies” among women, were active until 1815, when Maternal Associations were established throughout the churches and flourished until about 1842. The missionary society of 1799 emerged into the American Board of Commissioners for Foreign Missions, early in whose history it began its efforts to reach foreign women through the labors of single women.

All Christian denominations had strong convictions of duty towards countries where Christianity was not prevalant. When it was felt that female teachers were a necessity, self-sacrificing, earnest Christian women responded to the appeals for teachers.

As early as 1800, the women of the U.S. were interested in "home missions". In 1803, the first Woman's Home Missionary Society was formed at the First Church, Providence, Rhode Island, with the name of "FEMALE MITE SOCIETY" of First Baptist Church. Its object, "To aid in sending the gospel to the wilds of western New York and Pennsylvania". Other societies of like character followed, and for a number of years, were independent of any general organization.

Coincidently or providentially, the necessities of the American Civil War called forth their sympathy, fortitude and endurance. They became conscious of their power to relieve distress and to comfort the sick. Thus there was developed an ability to cooperate successfully and to work collectively. When peace was restored, women were prepared to engage both at home and abroad. They also felt that they could work more effectually in connection with their several denominational boards of missions.Some notable women's missionary societies included:
 American Zenana Mission - 1864
 Christian Woman's Board of Missions - 1874
 Council of Women for Home Missions - 1908
 Female Missionary Society -  1818
 Free Baptist Woman's Missionary Society - 1873
 Ladies' Medical Missionary Society of Philadelphia - 1851
 Woman's American Baptist Foreign Missionary Society - 1871
 Woman's American Baptist Home Mission Society - 1877
 Woman's Board for Foreign Missions of the Christian Church - 1886
 Woman's Board of Foreign Missions of Congregational churches - 1868
 Woman's Board of Foreign Missions of the Cumberland Presbyterian Church
 Woman's Board of Foreign Missions of the Presbyterian Church - 1870
 Woman's Board of Missions of the Interior - 1868
 Woman's Board of Missions for the Pacific
 Woman's Foreign Missionary Society of the Free Methodist Church of North America - 1882
 Woman's Foreign Missionary Society of the Methodist Episcopal Church - 1869
 Woman's Foreign Missionary Society of the Methodist Protestant Church - 1879
 Woman's Foreign Missionary Society of the Reformed Episcopal Church - 1889
 Woman's Foreign Missionary Union of Friends in America - 1887
 Woman's General Missionary Society of the Churches of God - 1903
 Woman's Home and Foreign Missionary Society of the General Synod of the Evangelical Lutheran Church in the USA
 Woman's Home and Foreign Missionary Society of the United Evangelical Church - 1891ref name="Foreign-1919" />
 Woman's Home and Foreign Mission Society of the Advent Christian Denomination - 1897
 Woman's Missionary Society of the UCC
 Woman's Missionary Union - 1888
 Woman's Union Missionary Society of America for Heathen Lands - 1861
 Women's Missionary Association of the Church of the UB
 Women's Missionary Association of the Presbyterian Church of England
 Woman's Missionary Society of the Evangelical Association - 1880
 Women's Missionary Society of the United Lutheran Church in America
 Women Teachers' Missionary Association

References

Christian missionary societies
International non-profit organizations
International medical and health organizations
International nongovernmental organizations
International volunteer organizations
Christian women's organizations